Traxler is a ghost town located in Alachua County, Florida, just north of the city of Alachua.

History
William H. Traxler, son of settlers from South Carolina, was born near the natural bridge in Columbia County in 1854. In the 1880s he acquired property in Alachua County on the Bellamy Road, opened a general store, and began farming. He married the daughter of Simeon Dell, Mary Lelia, in 1889. Prospering, he increased his holdings and enlarged the commissary. The post office, established in 1891 with Mr. Traxler as postmaster, was discontinued in 1906. At one time the community had a one-room school, a number of tenant farm homes, a cotton gin, grist mill, and church.

, the Spring Hill United Methodist Church, which was founded in 1860, continued to meet in Traxler.

Gallery

References

External links
History of Traxler
Springhill Methodist Church  Includes several pictures.

Former populated places in Alachua County, Florida
Ghost towns in Florida